William Michael Harry Rhodes (born 2 March 1995) is a cricketer who plays for Warwickshire, having formerly played for Yorkshire and for the England Under-19 cricket team. He is an all-rounder.

Rhodes made both his List A and Twenty20 debuts for Yorkshire during the 2013 English cricket season. In the same year, he also made 102 for England Under 19s against the Pakistan Under-19 cricket team.

Rhodes was the captain of the England Under 19s at the 2014 ICC Under-19 Cricket World Cup held in the United Arab Emirates. He led  the England U19s to victory over the tournament favorites, the India U19s, in the quarterfinals. In the semifinals, he rescued his side with an unbeaten 76 n.o. after the team was reduced to 119 for 6 in the 37th over. However, the England U19s lost the semifinal match to the Pakistan U19s in a tight contest. Rhodes nonetheless received praise for his captaincy in that match.

In June 2017, it was announced that Rhodes would join Warwickshire ahead of the 2018 season. 
In 2020 he was appointed Warwickshire club captain  
In July 2021, Rhodes was named as the captain of a County Select XI team to play India ahead of their Test series against England.

References

External links
 
 Will Rhodes at Warwickshire County Cricket Club

Living people
Yorkshire cricketers
Essex cricketers
English cricketers
Warwickshire cricketers
1995 births
Marylebone Cricket Club cricketers
Cricketers from Nottingham
English cricketers of the 21st century
Warwickshire cricket captains